Wyndham is a surname and a given name. Notable people with the name include:

Wyndhams of England 

The Wyndham or Wyndam family is descended from Sir John Wyndham of Crownthorpe and of Felbrigg, Norfolk (1443–1503), and wife Lady Margaret Howard (1445–1484/1524), daughter of John Howard, 1st Duke of Norfolk, and first wife Catherine Moleyns. Succeeding generations have played an important role in English politics, the law, the military and the arts.

Branches of the family are styled variously as Earl of Egremont, Earl of Thomond and Baron Ibracken, Baron Wyndham, Baron Leconfield and Baron Egremont, Wyndham Baronets, of Trent, Wyndham Baronets, of Pilsden Court, and Wyndham Baronets, of Orchard Wyndham: 

The senior line of the Wyndham family is today represented, despite its illegitimacy, by John Max Henry Scawen Wyndham, 7th Baron Leconfield, 2nd Baron Egremont, who lives at the family seat of Petworth House, Sussex.

Notable Wyndhams include: 
 Sir Thomas Wyndham of Felbrigg (c. 1466 – c. 1522), English sailor
 Thomas Wyndham (Royal Navy officer) (1508–1554), English soldier and sailor
 Sir John Wyndham (1558-1645) of Orchard Wyndham, Somerset, English defence organiser; son of Florence Wadham, Lady Wyndham (died 1596)
 Sir Hugh Wyndham (1602–1684), English judge
 Sir Wadham Wyndham (judge) (1609–1668), English judge
 Sir William Wyndham, 1st Baronet, of Orchard Wyndham (c. 1632–1683), English politician, Member of Parliament (MP) for Somerset 1656–1658 and for Taunton 1660–1679
 Thomas Wyndham (c. 1642-1689) of Witham Friary, Somerset, MP for Wells, Somerset
 Sir Edward Wyndham, 2nd Baronet (c. 1667–1695), English politician
 Thomas Wyndham, 1st Baron Wyndham (1681–1745) title in the Peerage of Ireland
 Charles William Wyndham (1760–1828), English Member of Parliament (MP) for Midhurst 1790–95, New Shoreham 1795–1802, and Sussex 1807–1812
 Sir Charles Wyndham (1638–1706), MP for Southampton (1679–1689 and 1689–1698) and St Ives (1698–1701)
 Sir William Wyndham, 3rd Baronet (1687–1740), English politician, Chancellor of the Exchequer 1713–1714
 Charles Wyndham, 2nd Earl of Egremont (1710–1763), British peer
 Percy Wyndham-O'Brien, 1st Earl of Thomond (c. 1713–1774), MP and Irish peer
 Henry Penruddocke Wyndham (1736–1819), British politician and topographer
 Wadham Wyndham (army officer) (1737–1812), English colonel and bon vivant
 William Windham (1750–1810), British Whig statesman
 George Wyndham, 3rd Earl of Egremont (1751–1837), British peer
 Dr Thomas Wyndham (1772-1862), English clergyman
 Wadham Wyndham (parliamentarian) (1773–1843), MP for Salisbury 1818–1833, 1835–1843
 George Wyndham, 1st Baron Leconfield (1787–1869), British peer
 Henry Wyndham (1790–1860), MP for West Cumberland 1857–1860
 Wadham Wyndham (political supporter) (1793–1849), DL, JP, and political supporter
 William Wyndham (1796-1862), MP for South Wiltshire 1852–1859
 Charles Wyndham (1796-1866), English Member of Parliament for West Sussex 1841–1847
 Henry Wyndham, 2nd Baron Leconfield (1830–1901), British peer
 Percy Wyndham (1835–1911), British politician
 Sir Hugh Wyndham (1836–1916), British diplomat
 Lt-Colonel Alfred Wyndham (1836-1914), British and Canadian army officer, pioneering rancher in Ontario and Alberta, Canada
 George Wyndham (1863–1913), British political figure and writer
 Lt.-Col. Guy Wyndham (1865–1941), soldier
 Charles Wyndham, 3rd Baron Leconfield (1872–1952), British peer
 Dr. Sir Harold Wyndham (1903–1988), Australian educator and public servant
 John Wyndham, 6th Baron Leconfield (1920–1972), British peer
 Francis Wyndham (1924–2017), British author and journalist, son of Lt Col Guy Wyndham
 Max Wyndham, 2nd Baron Egremont (born 1948), British author

Others with the surname 
 Anne Wyndham (born 1951), American television actress
 John Wyndham, pen name of English author John Wyndham Harris (1903–1969)
 Charles Wyndham (actor) (1837–1919), English actor (who assumed the name) and founded Wyndham's Theatre in the West End
 Frederick W. Wyndham (1853–1930), British actor and producer, managing director of Howard & Wyndham theatres in Scotland and England
 Martyn Wyndham-Read, musician
 Robert Henry Wyndham (1814–1894), British actor-manager, father of Frederick W. Wyndham
 Victoria Wyndham (born 1945), Mexican-American actress
 Valerie Wyndham, ring name of American professional wrestling valet Paige Mayo (born 1986)

People with the given name 
 Wyndham Cook (born 1943), Australian politician
 Wyndham Davies (1926–1984), British politician
 Wyndham Emery (1897–1969), Welsh rugby player
 Wyndham Halswelle (1882–1915), Scottish athlete
 Wyndham Hazelton (1894–1958), English cricketer
 Wyndham Lewis (1882–1957), English author and artist
 Wyndham Meredith Manning (1890–1967), South Carolina politician
 Wyndham Robertson (1803–1888), governor of Virginia, 1836–1837
 Wyndham Wise, Canadian film historian and critic

English masculine given names
Given names
Wyndham family